Cacostomus squamosus is a beetle of the family Lucanidae found in Australia.  
It is a diurnal species reaching a length up to 25 mm in males; it occurs on flowers in the eastern coastal forests of Australia. Its larvae, like those of most species of stag beetles, live in decaying wood.

References

External links
Cacostomus squamosus Australian Faunal Directory

Lucaninae
Beetles of Australia
Beetles described in 1840